HMS Oxlip was a  that served in the Royal Navy during World War II.

Construction
Oxlip was ordered in July 1939 as part of the Royal Navy's 1939 War Emergency building programme. She was laid down by A & J Inglis of Glasgow on 9 December 1940, launched on 28 August 1941 and completed on 28 December the same year. After working up and trials she joined Western Approaches Command for anti-submarine warfare and convoy escort duties.

Service history
From February 1942 onwards Oxlip served with close escort groups on Arctic convoys taking war materiel from the Western Allies to the Soviet Union. In three years Oxlip sailed with 18 Arctic convoys (outbound and homebound), contributing to the safe and timely arrival of more than 300 merchant ships. With the end of hostilities Oxlip was decommissioned and in 1946 she was sold.

Post-war service
She was stricken in March 1972.

Convoys escorted

Notes

References
 
 Gardiner R, Chesnau R: Conway's All the World's Fighting Ships 1922–1946 (1980) 
 Elliott, P : Allied Escort Ships of World War II  (1977)   
 Kemp P : Convoy! Drama in Arctic Waters (1993)   
 Ruegg, B, Hague A: Convoys to Russia 1941–1945 (1992)

External links
 HMS Oxlip at uboat.net

 

Oxlip
Ships built by Harland and Wolff